Leo Francis Grillo Jr. (born 1948) is an American film actor, producer and animal welfare activist. He is best known for founding Dedication and Everlasting Love to Animals Rescue, an animal welfare organization based in Acton, California. The not-for-profit organization was incorporated in 1981. The refuge has grown to become the largest care-for-life animal sanctuary of its type in the world.

Early life
Grillo was born in Lawrence, Massachusetts, to Carmela de Lucia and Leo Francis Grillo, Sr., both Italian-Americans. Grillo appeared in the 1972 television series Banacek. Grillo majored in theatre at Emerson College in Boston, MA.

Career
In 1977, Grillo moved from Boston to Los Angeles, California, to pursue a film career. He appeared in the 1977 John Heard film Between the Lines. Grillo studied under the tutelage of Charles E. Conrad, an acting coach credited with launching the film careers of Dee Wallace and Diana Ross, both Academy Award nominees.

Grillo was the lead actor in Dierdre's Party, a feature film he produced in 1998. Grillo played lead actor, opposite Katherine Heigl, in the 2006 independent film Zyzzyx Road. In 2009, Grillo co-wrote, produced and starred in Magic, opposite Sammi Hanratty, Lori Heuring, Christopher Lloyd and Robert Davi, who directed the movie.

Humanitarianism
Grillo and his staff of seventy care for more than 1,500 previously abandoned and abused animals on a daily basis at the D.E.L.T.A. Rescue sanctuary in Glendale, California. According to tax documents, Grillo takes no salary to run the 150-acre No-Kill refuge. Grillo founded Horse Rescue of America in 1988.

In 2008, Grillo created "Animals on the Edge," a global project that allows animals from other nations to benefit from Grillo's initiatives. Grillo co-conceived with wildlife photographer and author Chris Weston a book by the same name. The book identifies those animals currently living on the frontline of extinction.

Family
Grillo is the father of Meguire Elizabeth Grillo and Erica Lee Grillo.

Filmography

Actor
Magic (2010) (film) – Brad Fairmont
Zyzzyx Rd (2006) (film) – Grant
Deirdre's Party (1998) (film) – Leonard
The Defection of Simas Kudirka (TV) (1978) – Thomas
Between the Lines (1977) (TV) – Car Owner
Banacek (1972) (TV) – Mat
Detour to Nowhere (1972) (TV) – Mat

Self
Your Mommy Kills Animals (2007) (documentary)
Cats: Caressing the Tiger (1991) (National Geographic)

Producer
Magic (2010) (film) – executive producer
Zyzzyx Rd (2006) (film) – executive producer
The Rescuer (2005) – executive producer
Deirdre's Party (1998) – executive producer

Writer
Magic (2009) (film)

References

External links
 

Male actors from Massachusetts
American male film actors
American film producers
American animal welfare workers
Emerson College alumni
Living people
1948 births